Wilmer Bravo Isaga (born 22 December 1981) is a Venezuelan cyclist.

Palmares
2007
1st Stage 4 Vuelta a Venezuela
2010
1st Stage 3 Vuelta a Cuba
2011
1st Stage 6 Vuelta a Venezuela
2017
1st Stage 4 Vuelta al Táchira

References

1981 births
Living people
Venezuelan male cyclists